Baron Clwyd, of Abergele in the County of Denbigh, is a title in the Peerage of the United Kingdom. It was created in 1919 for the Liberal politician Sir John Roberts, 1st Baronet, who had previously represented Denbighshire West in the House of Commons. He had already been created a Baronet, of Brynwenallt in the parish of Abergele in the County of Denbigh, in the Baronetage of the United Kingdom in 1908. Lord Clwyd's father John Roberts had earlier been  Member of Parliament for Flint from 1878 to 1892.  the titles are held by his great-grandson, the fourth Baron, who succeeded his father in 2006.

The title of the barony, Clwyd, is pronounced "Cloo-id".

Barons Clwyd (1919)

John Herbert Roberts, 1st Baron Clwyd (1863–1955)
(John) Trevor Roberts, 2nd Baron Clwyd (1900–1987)
(John) Anthony Roberts, 3rd Baron Clwyd (1935–2006)
John Murray Roberts, 4th Baron Clwyd (born 1971)

The heir apparent is the present holder's son Hon. John David Roberts (born 2006).

Line of Succession

  John Herbert Roberts, 1st Baron Clwyd (1863–1955) 
  John Trevor Roberts, 2nd Baron Clwyd (1900–1987)
  John Anthony Roberts, 3rd Baron Clwyd (1935–2006)
  John Murray Roberts, 4th Baron Clwyd (born 1971)
 (1) Hon. John David Roberts (b. 2006)
 (2) Hon. Jeremy Trevor Roberts (b. 1973)
 (3) Hon. Hugh Gerald Arthur Roberts (b. 1977)
 Hon. David Stowell Roberts (1900–1956)
 (4) Hugh Martin Roberts (b. 1941)
 (5) Thomas Owen Roberts (b. 1973)
 (6) Peter Gareth Roberts (b. 1947)
 (7) Matthew Lewis Roberts (b. 1984)

References

Attribution

Kidd, Charles, Williamson, David (editors). Debrett's Peerage and Baronetage (1990 edition). New York: St Martin's Press, 1990, 

Baronies in the Peerage of the United Kingdom
Noble titles created in 1919
Noble titles created for UK MPs